Rienzi is an 1828 historical tragedy by the British writer Mary Russell Mitford. It is based on the fourteenth century Italian political leader Cola di Rienzo. It premiered at the Theatre Royal, Drury Lane on 9 October 1828. The original cast included Charles Mayne Young as Cola di Rienzi, John Cooper as Angelo Colonna, George Yarnold as Paolo, and Harriet Faucit as Lady Colonna. It was Mitford's most successful play and for 34 nights from October to December 1828, and then appeared frequently in the United States.

References

Bibliography
  Burwick, Frederick Goslee, Nancy Moore & Hoeveler Diane Long. The Encyclopedia of Romantic Literature. John Wiley & Sons,  2012.
 Matthews, David & Sanders, Michael. Subaltern Medievalisms: Medievalism 'from Below' in Nineteenth-century Britain. Boydell & Brewer, 2021.
 Nicoll, Allardyce. A History of Early Nineteenth Century Drama 1800-1850. Cambridge University Press, 1930.

1828 plays
West End plays
British plays
Tragedy plays
Historical plays
Plays set in Italy
Plays by Mary Russell Mitford
Plays set in the 14th century